The 58th Golden Globe Awards, honoring the best in film and television for 2000, were held on January 21, 2001. The nominations were announced on December 21, 2000.

Winners and nominees

Film 

The following films received multiple nominations:

The following films received multiple wins:

Television 

The following programs received multiple nominations:

The following  programs received multiple wins:

Ceremony

Presenters 

 Gillian Anderson
 Monica Bellucci
 Jeff Bridges
 Billy Campbell
 Don Cheadle
 George Clooney
 Phil Collins
 Tom Cruise
 Jamie Lee Curtis
 Robert Downey, Jr.
 Edie Falco
 Peter Fonda
 Brendan Fraser
 James Gandolfini
 Hugh Grant
 Patricia Heaton
 Angelina Jolie
 Melina Kanakaredes
 Nicole Kidman
 Eriq La Salle
 Heather Locklear
 Camryn Manheim
 Julianne Moore
 Haley Joel Osment
 Sarah Jessica Parker
 Bill Paxton
 Keanu Reeves
 Julia Roberts
 Kevin Spacey
 David Spade
 Hilary Swank
 Elizabeth Taylor
 Charlize Theron
 Vince Vaughn
 Denzel Washington
 Sigourney Weaver
 Reese Witherspoon

Awards breakdown 
The following networks received multiple nominations:

The following networks received multiple wins:

See also
 73rd Academy Awards
 21st Golden Raspberry Awards
 7th Screen Actors Guild Awards
 52nd Primetime Emmy Awards
 53rd Primetime Emmy Awards
 54th British Academy Film Awards
 55th Tony Awards
 2000 in film
 2000 in American television

References

058
2000 film awards
2000 television awards
January 2001 events in the United States
Golden